Russell Brand's Got Issues is a British TV debate comedy show hosted by Russell Brand and shown on E4. The show was written by Brand and his longtime collaborator Matt Morgan. Superficially a studio debate, as each episode progressed the subject was often digressed from heavily.

The format of the show changed somewhat after the first couple of episodes with the character of "General Zod's nephew" Andrew Zod being dropped, and the clips of people being interviewed on the street becoming clips of Brand trying out a given activity and acting in a skit in relation to that week's topic.

The viewing figures for the first episode were seen as disappointing, being beaten by nearly all of E4's main multi-channel rivals, despite a big publicity and promotional campaign for the show. Because of the poor ratings the show was repackaged as The Russell Brand Show and moved to Channel 4.

Episode guide

References

External links
Official website

2000s British comedy television series
2006 British television series debuts
2006 British television series endings
British television talk shows
Channel 4 comedy
English-language television shows
Russell Brand